Elzadie Robinson (possibly April 24, 1897 – January 17, 1975) was an American classic female blues singer and songwriter. She recorded 34 songs between 1926 and 1929. Unusually for the time, she composed or co-composed most of her work. Few details of her life outside the recording studio are known.

AllMusic noted that "Robinson was a second-level blues singer whose voice seemed to get stronger with time".

Biography
The music researchers Bob Eagle and Eric S. LeBlanc suggest that she was born Elzadie Wallace  in Logansport, DeSoto Parish, Louisiana, in 1897, but 1900 is also possible.

She relocated to Chicago to make her recordings and remained in the city for some while thereafter. Her recordings were made between 1926 and 1929. Robinson had different piano accompanists over that period, including Bob Call and her most regular accompanist, William Ezell. Songs most associated with them are "Barrelhouse Man", "Sawmill Blues" and the Ezell-penned number, "Arkansas Mill Blues", which related the grim reality of lumber camp work and conditions. Robinson chiefly recorded for Paramount Records but also cut several sides for Broadway Records using the alias Bernice Drake. On two of her recordings, the pianist Bob Call or the guitarist Johnny St. Cyr replaced Ezell, and on two occasions in 1926, B. T. Wingfield or Shirley Clay played the cornet, with either Tiny Parham or Richard M. Jones on the piano. In 1928, she was backed by the clarinetist Johnny Dodds, the guitarist Blind Blake and either the pianist Jimmy Blythe or Jimmy Bertrand on xylophone.

To add to the variation, two of her sides ("Galveston Blues" and "2:16 Blues") were released under the name of Blanche Johnson, another pseudonym.

Little is known of her life after her recording career ended. She is thought to have married Perry Henderson in Flint, Michigan, in 1928, and to have died there in 1975.

In 1994, Document Records issued two anthologies incorporating all of her known recorded work.

Discography

78 rpm singles - Paramount Records

78 rpm singles - Broadway Records

See also
List of classic female blues singers

References

External links
Robinson detailed discography

1897 births
1975 deaths
American blues singers
20th-century African-American women singers
Classic female blues singers
20th-century American singers
Paramount Records artists
Songwriters from Louisiana
Singers from Louisiana
People from Logansport, Louisiana
20th-century American women singers
African-American songwriters